Caribou Records is an American record label. It is owned by James William Guercio, who also owns Caribou Ranch recording studios and was the longtime manager of the band Chicago.

Caribou was an imprint of CBS Records, now Sony Music.

Discography

See also
 List of record labels
 Caribou Ranch

American record labels
Pop record labels